Sunday Marshall Katung (born 1 April 1961) is a Nigerian politician and lawyer. He was a one-term member of the Federal House of Representatives representing Jaba/Zangon Kataf Federal constituency of Kaduna State.

Life and education
Katung was born on April 1, 1961, in Madakiya, defunct Northern Region (now in Zangon Kataf LGA of southern Kaduna State), Nigeria. He attended Kufena College, Wusasa Zaria from 1975 to 1980; then proceeded to the College of Arts & Science, Zaria, from 1980 to 1982. He afterwards attended the University of Lagos, Akoka, from 1982 to 1986 and the Nigerian Law School, Victoria Island, Lagos from 1986 to 1987. He obtained a Post-Graduate Diploma in Management (PGDM) in 2000 and a Master's degree in Business Administration (MBA) from Ahmadu Bello University, Zaria, in 2005. He then got an Advanced Diploma certificate in Legal Drafting and Conveyancing at the Institute of Advanced Legal Studies, Akoka, Lagos. Among the several courses he attended are course on: Public Enterprise Restructuring at the International Law Institute, Washington DC, United States; Post-privatisation – Managing the Challenge in the same institution; Company Secretaries and Corporate Legal Adviser's Course at the Management School, London, UK; National Seminar on Company Law and Practice and Corporate Administration by AMIT Consultancy services LTD; Negotiation of International Contracts by POTOMAC WORKSHOPS; Legal and Financial Aspects of Pension Scheme and Trust Management by Lord SALISBURY CHAMBERS AND LIBRARY. As of 2018, was undergoing a PhD program at Ahmadu Bello University, Zaria.

Career
Katung served as:
 Commissioner of Water Resources; and of Finance, Kaduna State. (July 2010 - May 2011).
 Served as Company Secretary/Legal Adviser to Nigeria Reinsurance Corporation.
 As of 2020, a solicitor of the Supreme Court of Nigeria.

Politics
Katung contested under the party flagship of the PDP in 2015 and got elected as a member of Federal House of Representatives, representing Jaba/Zangon Kataf Federal constituency of Kaduna State.

His moral principles while still in serving in the Federal House of Representatives had been:

In 2018, he emerged as the deputy governorship candidate for the People's Democratic Party (PDP) Kaduna State governorship aspirant, Hon. Isah Ashiru.

References

Atyap people
People from Kaduna State
20th-century Nigerian lawyers
Peoples Democratic Party (Nigeria) politicians
Members of the House of Representatives (Nigeria)
1961 births
Living people
21st-century Nigerian lawyers